The  was an army of the Imperial Japanese Army during the final stages of World War II. It was annihilated during the Battle of Okinawa.

History
The Japanese 32nd Army was formed on March 13, 1944 as part of the last desperate defense effort by the Empire of Japan to deter possible landings of Allied forces in Okinawa and the surrounding Ryukyu Islands. The Japanese 32nd Army had 77,000 men (39,000 infantry in 31 battalions and 38,000 artillery, armor and combat service troops) plus the 10,000 man Okinawa Naval Base Force and 42,000 Okinawan conscripts. However, many of its personnel were poorly trained reservists, conscripted students and home guard militia. It was annihilated during the Battle of Okinawa from April to June, 1945.

List of commanders

Commanding officer

Chief of Staff

Structure
32nd Army, HQ at Naha, Okinawa
 9th Infantry Division (transferred to Taiwan, Dec 1944)
 24th Infantry Division - a conventional triangular division
22nd Infantry Regiment
23rd Infantry Regiment
44th Artillery Regiment
89th infantry Regiment
 62nd Infantry Division (a light two brigade COIN division that came from China).
63rd Infantry Brigade
64th Infantry Brigade
 28th Infantry Division
44th Independent Mixed Brigade
2nd Independent Mixed Regiment
15th Independent Mixed Regiment
45th Independent Mixed Brigade
59th Independent Mixed Brigade
60th Independent Mixed Brigade
Independent 27th Tank Regiment

References

External links

32
Military units and formations established in 1944
Military units and formations disestablished in 1945